Marion Borras (born 24 November 1997) is a French professional racing cyclist. She rode in the women's team pursuit event at the 2017 UCI Track Cycling World Championships.

Career results
2015
Belgian Xmas Meetings
1st Points Race
2nd Individual Pursuit
2nd Scratch Race
2016
2nd Individual Pursuit, Fenioux Piste International
Trofeu CAR Anadia Portugal
2nd Points Race
2nd Scratch Race
2nd Individual Pursuit
2018
1st Scratch Race, International Belgian Track Meeting

References

External links
 

1997 births
Living people
French female cyclists
Olympic cyclists of France
Cyclists at the 2020 Summer Olympics
Sportspeople from Isère
Cyclists from Auvergne-Rhône-Alpes
21st-century French women